Sainte-Croix-en-Bresse (literally Sainte-Croix in Bresse; before 2020: Sainte-Croix) is a commune in the Saône-et-Loire department in the region of Bourgogne-Franche-Comté in eastern France. The writer Rose Vincent (1918–2011) was born there.

Geography
The Solnan forms most of the commune's eastern border. The Sâne Morte forms part of the commune's southern border, flows northwestward through the commune, then forms most of its north-western border.

Notable residents
Waldeck Rochet (1905-1983) - Secretary General of the Communist Party of France (1964-1972)
Rose Vincent (1918-2011) - Journalist and writer

See also
Communes of the Saône-et-Loire department

References

Communes of Saône-et-Loire